Brigada Costa del Sol (or Drug Squad: Costa del Sol in English) is a Spanish television series produced by Mediaset España and Warner Bros. International Television Production España with the participation of Netflix. Starring Hugo Silva, Álvaro Cervantes, Miki Esparbé, Jesús Castro, and Sara Sálamo, it was presented to the media on April 3, 2019, and its premiere took place on May 6, 2019, on Spanish networks Telecinco and Cuatro.

History 
On May 28, 2018, Mediaset Spain and Netflix announced they had reached an agreement to produce their first series together, with Warner Bros. ITVP Spain as co-producer. The names of the main cast of the series were also confirmed, including Hugo Silva, Álvaro Cervantes, Miki Esparbé, Jesús Castro, and Sara Sálamo.
Recording began on June 7 in Málaga Province and concluded in early February 2019.
Brigada Costa del Sol was one of the only Spanish series to be selected for the MIPDrama MIPTV 2019 event.

The first season became available worldwide in its entirety on Netflix on October 25, 2019.

Plot 

In 1977, a group of police detectives with limited resources, but a lot of ingenuity and courage, is picked to form a special drug-fighting brigade in Torremolinos on the Costa del Sol. The series is based on the true story of the Grupo Especial de Estupefacientes Costa del Sol, one of Spain's first anti-narcotics squads.

Cast 

 Hugo Silva – Bruno López
 Álvaro Cervantes – Leo Villa
 Miki Esparbé – Martín Pulido
 Jesús Castro – Terrón
 Sara Sálamo – Yolanda "Owlet"

Secondary 

 Jorge Usón – Reyes
 Cayetana Cabezas – Marielena
 Pablo Béjar – Chino (Episode 1 - Episode 2 - Episode 3 - Episode 4 - Episode 5 - Episode 6 - Episode 7; Episode 9 - Episode 10 - Episode 11 - Episode 12 - Episode 13)
 Marco Cáceres – Franchi (Episode 1 - Episode 2; Episode 4; Episode 6 - Episode 8; Episode 10 - Episode 13)
 Olivia Delcán – Vicky López
 Jorge Suquet – Cristóbal Peña (Episode 1 - Episode 3; Episode 6 - Episode 8)
 Daniel Holguín – Atilano Peña (Episode 1 - Episode 3; Episode 5 - Episode 13)
 Joaquín Galletero – Lucas
 Carolina Yuste – Sole
 Ana Fernández – Alicia (Episode 1 - Episode 4; Episode 6 - Episode 13)
 Camino Fernández – Charo

Guests 

 Manolo Caro – Dandy (Episode 1 - Episode 2; Episode 8)
 Paco Marín – Inspector Cifu (Episode 1 - Episode 9; Episode 11 - Episode 12)
 Nieve de Medina – Gloria (Episode 3; Episode 6; Episode 12)
 Julián Villagrán – Fredo (Episode 4 - Episode 6)
 Pepón Nieto – Emilio Tortajada (Episode 6)
 Joaquín Núñez – Roque (Episode 8 - Episode 13)
 Adrià Collado – Evaristo (Episode 9; Episode 12)
 Unax Ugalde – Edi (Episode 9 - Episode 13)
 Javier Albalá – ¿? (Episode 11)

Seasons and episodes 

The series premiere took place simultaneously on the two main channels of the Mediaset España group on May 6, 2019. For the premiere, a special broadcast filling all of prime time combined the first and the second chapter as if they were a film of about 135 minutes, which was seen by 1,706,000 viewers (12.7% share) on Telecinco and 763,000 (5.7%) on Cuatro. The remaining 11 episodes that make up the first season aired in their usual format on Telecinco.

Season 1 (2019)

References 

Telecinco network series
Spanish-language television shows
2019 Spanish television series debuts
Works about organized crime in Spain
2019 Spanish television series endings
Television series set in 1977
Television shows set in Andalusia
Law enforcement in fiction
Television shows filmed in Spain
2010s Spanish drama television series
Television series by Warner Bros. Television Studios